Lieutenant General J. Alain J. Parent  is a retired senior Royal Canadian Air Force officer, who served as acting Vice Chief of the Defence Staff from May 2017 until his retirement in June 2018.

Military career
Parent joined the Canadian Forces in 1979. Following certification of his pilot training in 1985, he flew a variety of Air Command helicopter and accrued over 4900 hours of flying on the CH-136 Kiowa, CH-135 Twin Huey and the CH-146 Griffon.

Parent became Commander of 1 Canadian Air Division in July 2011. He served as the Deputy Commander of North American Aerospace Defense Command (NORAD) from 2012 and was appointed acting Vice Chief of the Defence Staff on 30 May 2017.

Personal life
He is married and has two children.

Awards and decorations

Parent's personal awards and decorations include the following:

File:CD-ribbon and 2 bars.png

80px

 He was a qualified RCAF Pilot and as such wore the RCAF Flight wings
80px Command Commendation

Notes

References

Living people
Canadian Forces Air Command generals
Commanders of the Order of Military Merit (Canada)
Year of birth missing (living people)